Tmassa is a small town in the Sahara Desert of central Libya about  from the Gulf of Sidra. Its population is 500.

Maps
http://www.maplandia.com/libya/murzuq/tmassah/

References

Populated places in Murzuq District